Big Razorback Island is the southeasternmost of the Dellbridge Islands, lying in Erebus Bay off the west side of Ross Island. It was discovered and named by the British National Antarctic Expedition, 1901–04, under Robert Falcon Scott. The name reflects the supposed similarity of the shape of the island to a large Razorback.

See also 
 List of antarctic and sub-antarctic islands

References
 

Ross Archipelago